Parastenolechia nigrinotella is a moth of the family Gelechiidae. It is found in Turkey, on Sicily and in Spain, France, Italy, Austria, the Czech Republic, Slovakia, Croatia, Hungary, Romania, Bulgaria, North Macedonia and Greece.

The larvae feed on Quercus pubescens.

References

Moths described in 1847
Parastenolechia